Park Jong-chun (born 13 May 1960) is a South Korean basketball player. He competed in the men's tournament at the 1988 Summer Olympics.

References

External links
 

1960 births
Living people
South Korean men's basketball players
1978 FIBA World Championship players
Olympic basketball players of South Korea
Basketball players at the 1988 Summer Olympics
Place of birth missing (living people)
Asian Games medalists in basketball
Asian Games gold medalists for South Korea
Basketball players at the 1982 Asian Games
Medalists at the 1982 Asian Games